BlackBerry Curve is a brand of professional smartphones that were manufactured by BlackBerry Ltd from 2007 until 2013.

Early series

Curve 8300 Series
The BlackBerry Curve brand was introduced on May 3, 2007 with OS version 4.5 with the Curve 8300 series.  The Curve brand continued the "consumer-oriented" philosophy of the BlackBerry Pearl and 8800 series, including multimedia features and a built-in camera.  As is customary for BlackBerry devices, the 8300 series consists of several models offered by different wireless providers, supporting that provider's network along with specific services.

In total, 5 variants were released; 8300, 8310, 8320, 8330 and 8350i.  The 8300, 8310, and 8320 are able to support North American and European GSM technologies. Later in 2007, the 8310 was launched with GPS.

At the end of 2007, Research in Motion announced the 8320 featuring Wi-Fi but lacking a GPS receiver.

In early 2008, which is Verizon Wireless and Research in Motion the first CDMA Curve, the Curve 8330. This phone also featured upgraded memory as well and GPS.  It only served the 800/1900 MHz range for CDMA2000 and 1xEV-DO. It was also the first Curve to have video recording at 240 x 176 resolution in 3GP format.

The 8350i was the last of the 8300 series to come out, which supported the 800/900 MHz iDEN and Push-to-Talk. It had 128 MB of memory and weighed 135g.

CNET's Bonnie Cha gave the Curve an "Excellent" rating. However, she found the Curve 8300's lack of 3G and Wi-Fi disappointing. Also disappointing was the phone's lack of video-recording capabilities. Call quality was determined to be subpar and calls sounded hollow on the Curve 8300. While the 8300 as originally released lacked Video Recording and Voice Note Recording, these functions have been provided with the Blackberry OS 4.5 release.

Curve 8900
The Blackberry 8900 was released in early 2009 with OS version 5.0 as a quad-band GSM/GPRS/EDGE phone and named the Curve 8900.  The device is an upgrade over the older 8300 model, with the most significant differences being a 3.2-megapixel camera, a micro-USB port, Wi-Fi, and an upgraded operating system.

The initial release was in February 2009 on T-Mobile but was later released on AT&T as well. This phone is known as Blackberry Javelin in Asia.  @ China Mobile versions were released the 8910 in 2010 and 2011 the 8980.  The 8910 is identical except for the removal of wifi to comply with Chinese regulations at the time. The 8980 design is radically different from the 8900 or 8910; its design cues are virtually identical to the Blackberry Bold 9700/9780/9788 series but lacking 3G capabilities; the 8980's keyboard is the typical Curve "chicklet".

While not as positive as other BlackBerry phones, the reviews of the Curve 8900 were mostly positive with praise for the improvements made over previous models but was criticized for the lack of 3G and a relatively slow processor. The 8900 was also praised for its new, stylish and confident look.

Curve 8500 Series
The BlackBerry Curve 8500 series was announced in July 2009 and released the following August with OS version 5.0. This series continued Research in Motion's developing "consumer-oriented" philosophy of the BlackBerry Pearl and Curve 8300 series smartphones with the inclusion of additional multimedia features.  It was also the first BlackBerry to introduce the new trackpad vs. the trackball in previous models.  A CDMA version was released as the Curve 8530.

Curve 9300 3G 
The BlackBerry Curve 3G 9300, with original OS version 6.0, is a mid-range smartphone developed by Research in Motion and was the first Curve device to function on 3G networks.  The 9300, and its CDMA counterpart, the Curve 9330, also contained some minor improvements over the 8500 series including a faster processor and the ability to upgrade the OS to BlackBerry 6.  The BlackBerry Curve 9300 series also continued with the dedicated media keys on the top first introduced with the BlackBerry Curve 8500 Series.  The Curve 9300 was released on Rogers Wireless in Canada on Aug 4, 2010.

BlackBerry 7 series

BlackBerry Curve 9220/9310/9320/9321
This series of BlackBerry Curve handsets are low-end models developed mainly for developing economies and budget-conscious consumers. They are stripped-down versions of the mid-range Curve 9350/60/70 series, with a lower resolution screen, lower camera resolution and thicker design but a higher capacity battery. Unique features include a dedicated BBM convenience key and FM receiver. The 9320 and 9321 use 3G and 2G and were released in May 2012. The 9310 uses CDMA and was released in July 2012. The 9220 uses 2G GSM and was launched first in India on April 19, 2012.

BlackBerry Curve 9350/9360/9370 
The Curve 9350/9360/9370 are mid-range models in the Curve series announced in August 2011 and released September 2011 with OS version 7.1. The Curve 9350 series has a slimmer, lighter-weight design with improved technical specifications over the Curve 9300 series and also runs BlackBerry OS 7.1. The 9370 is a CDMA/GSM World Edition, the 9360 is a 3G GSM/HSPA+ variant, and the 9350 is a CDMA only variant. The series of phones includes a 5-megapixel camera with an LED flash and uses an 800mhz single core processor.

All the phones include NFC, Wi-Fi Calling and FM radio with the OS 7.1 upgrade. The 9370 has more eMMC memory than its siblings at 1 GB as compared to 512 MB. A 4G version was available with select carriers eventually.

BlackBerry Curve 9380 Series
The Curve 9380, announced in November 2011, is the first Curve with a touchscreen instead of a physical keyboard. The phone is an entry-level counterpart to the Torch 9860, which is similarly an all-touchscreen phone without physical keyboard.

TechRadar gave the Curve 9380 three out of five stars, complimenting its affordability, the quality of its screen, its design for being more comfortable and not as fragile as other smartphones, and the improvements in the 7.0 operating system. However, reviewers also felt the device felt unstable, its social networking integration was of inconsistent quality, the implementation the BlackBerry OS on a touchscreen device wasn't as elegant or mature as other smartphone platforms, and concluded that the phone "[isn't the] best option in its price range."

Model comparison 
The following tables highlight features of the different models.

Early series

BlackBerry 7 series

References

External links

 Official Site Curve 83xx Series
 Official Site Curve 8900
 Official Site Curve 85xx Series
 Official Site Curve 3G(93xx) Series

Curve
Mobile phones with an integrated hardware keyboard